The Minister for Food and Agriculture is the Ghanaian government official responsible for the Ministry of Food and Agriculture. The Minister is responsible to government and the Parliament of Ghana for the development of Ghana's agriculture and maintaining food security in Ghana. This minister has in the past been also responsible for a Ministry of Cocoa Affairs which has now been absorbed back into the Ministry of Agriculture.

List of ministers
The first Ghanaian to head this ministry was Boahene Yeboah-Afari. The current minister is Owusu Afriyie Akoto (MP).

See also

 Ministry of Food and Agriculture

References

External links and sources
 Former Heads of MOFA

Politics of Ghana
Food and Agriculture